Gopankop is a village in Dharwad district of Karnataka, India. According to Census 2011 information the location code or village code of Gopankop village is 602377. Gopankop village is located in Hubli Tehsil of Dharwad district in Karnataka, India.

Demographics 
As of the 2011 Census of India there was 1 household in Gopankop and a total population of 2 consisting of 1 male and 1 female. There were no children ages 0–6.

References

Villages in Dharwad district